is a Japanese manga series written and illustrated by Lynn Okamoto. It was serialized in Shueisha's seinen manga  magazine Weekly Young Jump from October 2007 to December 2010, with its chapters collected in 13 tankōbon volumes The plot follows ski jumper Nono Nonomiya, the daughter of a disgraced Olympian who aims to reclaim her family's honor. However, since only men are eligible to compete in the Olympics in ski jumping, Nono cross dresses and assumes her twin brother's identity. Her brother, Yūta Nonomiya, whose name she takes, perished in a fire.

Plot
Nono Nonomiya is a girl with exceptional skill in ski jumping who is hoping to fulfill her father's and her brother's dreams of winning the gold medal at the Olympics.  However, since Woman's Ski Jumping isn't a recognized Olympic category, Nono must cross-dress and disguise herself as her twin brother, Yuuta Nonomiya, in order to be eligible to compete.  After being admitted into Okushin High School in Nagano, famous for its winter sports clubs, and entering the ski jumping club, her struggle to enter the Olympics and win the gold medal for Japan truly begins.

Characters

Main characters

Nono Nonomiya, better known as Yuuta Nonomiya, was originally from Hokkaido, but moved after her brother's death. Ever since she was young, she displayed a lot of talent in ski jumping. Before high school, she was in three competitions, all while she was in her third year of elementary school. The first two were elementary school competitions that she easily won. In the third competition, she was put in the middle school division, facing boys up to six years her senior, but she still ended up placing first. She hoped to make her father, a former Olympic ski jumper, proud of her but she did not realize that women cannot enter the Olympics. Her talent and her brother's lack of talent resulted in her father resenting her and her brother envying her. Once she realized that she could not earn an Olympic medal, she decided to quit ski jumping even though she loved the sport. However, when her brother committed suicide in a fire, he left a note for Nono, telling her to throw away her real identity to pretend to be him. 
Nono wears a corset in order to hide her breasts. Despite posing as a man and trying her best to act manly, she has a liking for feminine and cute things. She is very intelligent and has the top grades of her year. This combined with her bishounen aspect caused her to be the target of Mikage early in the story. She, however, has feelings for a fellow member of the ski jumping club, Akira Amatsu. Nono occasionally sees a vision of her brother before she jumps and considers this as a sign that the jump will go poorly.

Akira was born into a family of ski jumping medalists, a fact which he is very proud of. However, his father and grandfather only managed to obtain silver medals in the Olympics, giving the family the nickname "silver medal collectors". Akira will easily forgive anyone who talks badly about him, but does not stand anyone insulting his family. Since he wanted to be recognized by his talent rather than his family name, he decided to make everyone acknowledge him by never losing. His father stated that Akira will prioritize winning over his own life. As a result of his hard work and his lineage, his talent was noticed at an early age. He got a joint development with a Northern European ski manufacturers when he was 15 years old.
Akira has an odd allergy to women, and will break out into hives whenever he is close to one. The only females he can be close to without reacting to are those he likes.

Secondary characters

Mikage is a famous figure skater, well known for having won an international championship. She is a feminine and cute girl, and many students like her. She, however, fell in love with Nono, whom she believes is male, during the opening ceremony of the school. She immediately confessed, which resulted in her being rejected. Later that day, she walked in on Nono dressing and saw Nono wearing panties. However, she thought that Nono just liked wearing women's underwear. Nono admitted this in order not to get caught, and Mikage thus stated that Nono should be her slave if she did not want her to tell everyone about this. 
In spite of her manipulative and playful nature, she really likes Nono and cares a lot about her. This is shown when she offers Nono to live at her place after Nono was almost raped by her roommate in the male dorms and when she tried to cheer the Nono up whenever she is feeling down. She notices Nono's liking towards Akira, and takes a disliking to him as a result. Since her sport involves resistance rather than strength, her endurance is greater than that of the ski club's member's. Even though she is often described as a genius, in reality she is a hard-working girl who will train endlessly in order to improve and become a better skater.

Yoda is a sports magazine editor and is often seen around ski jumping events. His goal is to bring more attention to the sport. He was once a ski jumper himself, but quit after realizing he had no talent. He claims to be able to tell the level of a person's talent with one glance by seeing the aura they give off. Wanting to stir up things in the skiing world, he lied to Akira to get him to compete against Nono. He once stated that Nono and Akira would be the ones who would change the Japan's future in ski jumping. Yoda was also the first person in the story to discover that Nono is actually a girl pretending to be her brother.

Yuuta is Nono's twin brother. He committed suicide before the start of the story, however all the official records state that Nono was the one who died. Due to his father failing to win a gold medal at the Olympics, Yuuta spent a lot of time daily training in ski jumping. However, due to lack of talent and his father forcing him to use older techniques rather than modern ones, Yuuta did poorly in the sport. Even in middle school, he could not beat the 67 meter mark that Nono set at a competition when they were in third grade. In his final year of competition in middle school, Yuuta placed 85th out of 89 people in the Hokkaido regional tournament. Since he was never even able to get to the second jump at regionals, he was nicknamed "regional dropout". His father would occasionally beat him in anger and disappointment and once threatened to kill him if he did not do well enough. He envied Nono for her talent but he also felt guilty because it was due to his lack of talent that Nono felt compelled to quit ski jumping. Besides ski jumping, Yuuta worked part time in construction and spent his free time painting. He had a lot of talent in painting but he refused to acknowledge it because he felt he had to ski jump. He won a national art competition but he died before he heard the results. After his father's attempted suicide, Yuuta decided to commit suicide himself. He stole Nono's clothes and set fire to the shed he was in. He left a note for Nono, telling her to become him and win the gold medal.
Nono will occasionally see a vision of him before she jumps and considers this as an indication that the jump will go poorly.
Yuusuke Yura
Yuusuke is the father of Nono and Yuuta. He used to represent Japan internationally in ski jumping and was celebrated nationally. However the last competition he did was the team event at the Olympics. Japan was in first place and all Yuusuke had to do was a regular jump for Japan to win. However, due to pressure and a preexisting knee injury, Yuusuke fell causing Japan to go into fourth place. This caused all of Japan to hate Yuusuke and by extension his family. The situation was so bad, that Nono's and Yuuta's last names were changed from Yura to Nonomiya, their mother's maiden name.
Since Yuusuke was no longer able to compete, he wished for his son to earn the gold medal at the Olympics in his stead. However, Yuuta had no talent in ski jumping while his sister Nono had an abundance of talent. Since women cannot compete in the Olympics, this resulted in Yuusuke resenting his daughter and beating his son. After the Yuuta's final Hokkaido regional tournament, Yuusuke gave up on his son. He attempted to commit suicide by hanging himself but Yuuta and Nono found him. Yuusuke was gotten to the hospital in enough time to save his life but remains in a coma.

Kiyoshi is a high school senior in Okushin High and leader of the Nordic Skiing squad. Even though the leadership of the ski club is switched between the Alpine and Nordic squad leaders, the Alpine leader took the seat for two years in a row due to Kiyoshi's twisted nature. Due to this, Kiyoshi forces everyone to call him "Emperor". He dislikes his own surname, since it literally means "Anal Shop", and will react violently if he is referred by it. He is a veteran jumper and placed third at the inter high competition in his junior year. This, together with holding the best records in the club, make him the ace of the team. Kiyoshi is in love with Mikage and tries to blackmail Nono into taking pictures of her breasts.

Hiroki is a high school freshman in Okushin High and is a member of the ski jumping club. He has been friends with Akira since middle school and quickly becomes good friends with Nono. He used to attend elementary school with Kiyoshi, and thus knows of his terrible personality. He believes that Shiriya once killed a jumper who was better than him and thus is terrified of Kiyoshi.

Media

Manga
Nononono, written and illustrated by Lynn Okamoto, was serialized in Shueisha's seinen manga magazine Weekly Young Jump from October 25, 2007, to December 9, 2010. Shueisha collected its chapters in thirteen tankōbon volumes, released from March 19, 2008, to February 18, 2011.

Volume list

Audio drama
Shueisha web broadcast a series of audio dramas with Mamiko Noto in the lead of role of Nonomiya Yuuta.

References

External links
Nononono at Shueisha  
Official radio drama site 

2007 manga
Seinen manga
Shueisha manga
Sports anime and manga
Transgender in anime and manga